Mtikitiki, is a businesswoman and corporate executive in South Africa, who is the Vice President for the South African franchise of Coca-Cola International, effective 1 January 2021. Before that, from June 2019 until December 2020, she was the regional general manager responsible for the Coca-Cola company's franchise in the East and Central African regions. She was based in Nairobi, Kenya.

Background and education
 was born in a township near Mbombela, in Mpumalanga Province, South Africa, in the 1970s. At the time of her birth, Mbombela was known as Nelspruit. She attended local schools for her pre-university education. She was then admitted to the University of KwaZulu Natal, where she obtained a Bachelor of Business Administration. Later, she was awarded a Master of Business Administration by Henley Business School South Africa.

Career

In January 1998, she was recruited by the Coca-Cola Company, while at university. The company took her through an intensive management programme. She then worked at different bottling entities in South Africa. Her work roles varied and her responsibilities were gradually increased. During her tenure at Coca-Cola, she completed her Master of Business Administration degree.

Prior to her appointment,  was the Vice President and General Manager for the East and Central Africa regions. Before that, from 2017 until 2019, she served as the Regional Franchise Manager of the Coca-Cola Southern and East Africa Business Unit (SEABU), responsible for the countries of Botswana, Mozambique, Namibia, and Zambia. At the South African unit, she replaced Luis Avellar who was appointed president of operations in Latin America. She is based in Johannesburg, in South Africa.

Family
 Mtikitiki is a married mother of three children, ranging from 18 years to three years of age, as of August 2018.

See also
 Tebogo Mashego
 Nokwanda Mngeni
 Fundi Tshazibana

References

External links
 Coca-Cola is committed to actions that support healthier food environments As of 2 June 2021.
 Coca-Cola Appoints New General Manager, East and Central Africa Franchise As of 8 May 2019.

Living people
1970s births
People from Mpumalanga
21st-century South African businesswomen
21st-century South African businesspeople
South African business executives
University of KwaZulu-Natal alumni
Alumni of Henley Management College